Joanna Weale (born 1975) is a Welsh international lawn and indoor bowler.

She won a bronze medal in the pairs with Anwen Butten at the 2002 Commonwealth Games in Manchester.

She bowls for the Llandrindod Wells Bowling Club and is part of a famous Welsh bowling family. She is married to former Welsh national champion Brian Weale and is the sister-in-law to former national champions David, Stuart and Robert (a former World champion).

References

Living people
1975 births
Commonwealth Games bronze medallists for Wales
Bowls players at the 2002 Commonwealth Games
Welsh female bowls players
Commonwealth Games medallists in lawn bowls
Medallists at the 2002 Commonwealth Games